The 2017 Wolffkran Open was a professional tennis tournament played on carpet courts. It was the first edition of the tournament which was part of the 2017 ATP Challenger Tour. It took place in Ismaning, Germany between 16 and 22 October 2017.

Singles main draw entrants

Seeds

 1 Rankings are as of 9 October 2017.

Other entrants
The following players received wildcards into the singles main draw:
  Andreas Haider-Maurer
  Kevin Krawietz
  Rudolf Molleker
  Tim Pütz

The following players received entry into the singles main draw as special exempts:
  Matteo Donati
  Lorenzo Sonego

The following player received entry into the singles main draw using a protected ranking:
  Igor Sijsling

The following players received entry from the qualifying draw:
  Hubert Hurkacz
  Marc-Andrea Hüsler
  Tobias Simon
  Yannick Vandenbulcke

The following players received entry as lucky losers:
  Shalva Dzhanashia
  Mats Rosenkranz
  Volodymyr Uzhylovskyi

Champions

Singles

 Yannick Hanfmann def.  Lorenzo Sonego 6–4, 3–6, 7–5.

Doubles

 Marin Draganja /  Tomislav Draganja def.  Dustin Brown /  Tim Pütz 6–7(1–7), 6–2, [10–8].

External links
 Official website

Wolffkran Open
2017
Wolf